Zagaj may refer to the following places:
Zagaj, Greater Poland Voivodeship (west-central Poland)
Zagaj, Łódź Voivodeship (central Poland)
Zagaj, West Pomeranian Voivodeship (north-west Poland)